Marolt is a surname. Notable people with the surname include:

Bill Marolt (born 1943), American alpine ski racer, coach, and sports administrator
Larissa Marolt (born 1992), Austrian fashion model and actress
Max Marolt (1936–2003), American alpine skier
Žan Marolt (1964–2009), Bosnian actor and TV personality